Jim L. Allen (March 22, 1934 – January 20, 2003) was an American politician who served in the Kansas House of Representatives and Kansas State Senate.

Allen was elected to the Kansas House in 1978, taking office in January 1979 and serving only a single term. He successfully ran for the state senate in 1980 and was re-elected in 1984 and 1988, resigning his seat in July 1991.

Allen worked as a dairy farmer.

References

1934 births
2003 deaths
Republican Party Kansas state senators
Republican Party members of the Kansas House of Representatives
20th-century American politicians
People from Ottawa, Kansas